The American Association of Political Consultants (AAPC) is the trade group for the political consulting profession in the United States.  Founded in 1969, it is the world's largest organization of political consultants, public affairs professionals and communications specialists.  Its "multipartisan" membership consists of political consultants, pollsters, media consultants, campaign managers, corporate public affairs officers, professors, lobbyists, fundraisers, congressional staffers, and vendors.

The American Association of Political Consultants maintains a "Code of Professional Ethics" for members.

Activities

The American Association of Political Consultants hosts the annual Pollie Awards and Conference. The Pollie Awards are the most prestigious awards in the field of political campaign and public affairs industry, in which the AAPC recognizes the best in the business of political professionals in hundreds of political campaign and public affairs categories. A new statue was made by New York firm Society Awards for the 2015 Pollie Awards. The AAPC also hosts several regional conferences throughout the year that feature several panelists who are specialists for the upcoming elections.

The AAPC seeks to set the standards of conduct for political and public affairs consulting through its "Code of Professional Ethics". Applicants for AAPC membership are required to sign the code, and to live by the standards it sets, as a condition of membership in the organization.

Board of Directors
As of 2019, officers of the Board of Directors are:
Chairman: Mark Mellman, The Mellman Group (D) – Polling
President – Tom Shepard, Tom Shepard & Associates (R) – General
Vice President – Rose Kapolczynski, Rose Kapolczynski Consulting (D) – General
Secretary/Treasurer – Rebecca Donatelli, Campaign Solutions (R) - Internet

Chapter Presidents 
As of 2019, Chapter Presidents are:
 Jaimey Sexton, The Sexton Group – Mid-West
 Michael Turk, Opinion Mover Strategies – Mid-Atlantic
 Bart Robbett, Robbett Advocacy Media, LLC – Greater New York 
 John Rowley, Fletcher Rowley, Inc. – Southern 
 James Aldrete, Message Audience & Presentation – Southwest

References

External links
 

Professional associations based in the United States
Political science organizations
Organizations established in 1969